Engi may refer to:
 ENGI, a Japanese animation studio
 Engi, Switzerland, a former municipality in the canton of Glarus in Switzerland
 Engi (era), a Japanese era